The Wisconsin Technical College Conference (WTCC) was an athletic conference established in 1966 in Wisconsin comprising the technical schools in the Wisconsin Technical College System that have varsity athletic programs.  The year 2009 saw the end of the WTCC when Madison Tech and Milwaukee Tech ended membership and joined the N4C conference of Illinois junior college teams.  Western Technical College and Fox Valley Technical College still remain in the Wisconsin Junior College Athletic Association (WJCAA).

Members
This is a list of all the former members of the conference.  Only Madison, Milwaukee, Western and Fox Valley Tech still field athletic programs.

Defunct college sports conferences in the United States
College sports in Wisconsin